Reginald Gerard Glennie (11 November 1864 – 24 October 1953) was an English first-class cricketer and clergyman.

The son of the cricketer and clergyman John Glennie, he was born in November 1864 at Blore, Staffordshire. He was educated at The King's School in Canterbury, before going up to Keble College, Oxford. While studying at Oxford, he played two first-class cricket matches for Oxford University in 1886, against the touring Australians and Surrey. During his studies, he played minor matches for Staffordshire, a second-class county. 

After graduating from Oxford, Glennie took holy orders in the Church of England. He was personal chaplain to William Maclagan, the Archbishop of York, from 1892 to 1895. From 1895 to 1903 he held the post of vicar at Egton in North Yorkshire, before becoming vicar at Sherburn in Elmet in 1903, a post he held until 1912. While holding that post, he was simultaneously the rural dean of Selby, which he was appointed to in 1907 and held until 1922, after which he served as the rural dean of Tadcaster between 1922–26. He was vicar at Boston Spa from 1912 to 1926, and was appointed a canon of York Minster in 1922. After serving as vicar at Boston Spa, he came the vicar at East Harlsey in 1926. Glennie died at Worcester in October 1953.

References

External links

1864 births
1953 deaths
People from Staffordshire Moorlands (district)
People educated at The King's School, Canterbury
Alumni of Keble College, Oxford
English cricketers
Oxford University cricketers
19th-century English Anglican priests
20th-century English Anglican priests